is the most important Shinto shrine in the city of Kamakura, Kanagawa Prefecture, Japan.   The shrine is a cultural center of the city of Kamakura and serves as the venue of many of its most important festivals with two museums.

For most of its history, it served both as a Hachiman shrine, and in latter years a Tendai Buddhist temple typical of Japanese Buddhist architecture. The famed Buddhist priest Nichiren Daishonin once reputedly visited the shrine to reprimand the kami Hachiman just before his execution at Shichirigahama beach.

A former one thousand-year-old ginkgo tree near its entrance was uprooted by a storm on 10 March 2010. The shrine continues to serve as one of the Important Cultural Properties of Japan.

History
This shrine was originally built in 1063 as a branch of Iwashimizu Shrine in Zaimokuza where tiny Moto Hachiman now stands and dedicated to the Emperor Ōjin, (deified with the name Hachiman, tutelary kami of warriors), his mother Empress Jingu and his wife Hime-gami. Minamoto no Yoritomo, the founder of the Kamakura shogunate, moved it to its present location in 1191 and invited Hachiman to reside in the new location to protect his government. The shrine caught a major fire in 14 November 1280, where several artifacts were also stolen from the inner sanctum of the shrine.

Assassination of Minamoto no Sanetomo 
One of the historical events the shrine is tied to is the assassination of Sanetomo, last of Minamoto no Yoritomo's sons.

Under heavy snow on the evening of February 12, 1219 (Jōkyū 1, 26th day of the 1st month), shōgun Minamoto no Sanetomo was coming down from Tsurugaoka Hachimangū's Senior Shrine after assisting to a ceremony celebrating his nomination to Udaijin. His nephew Kugyō, son of second shōgun Minamoto no Yoriie, came out from next to the stone stairway of the shrine, then suddenly attacked and assassinated him in the hope to become shōgun himself. The killer is often described as hiding behind the giant ginkgo, but no contemporary text mentions the tree, and this detail is likely an Edo-period invention first appeared in Tokugawa Mitsukuni's Shinpen Kamakurashi. For his act Kugyō was himself beheaded a few hours later, thus bringing the Seiwa Genji line of the Minamoto clan and their rule in Kamakura to a sudden end.

Shrine and temple 
The mixing of Buddhism and kami worship in shrine-temple complexes like Tsurugaoka called jingū-ji had been normal for centuries until the Meiji government decided, for political reasons, that this was to change. (According to the honji suijaku theory, Japanese kami were just local manifestations of universal buddhas, and Hachiman in particular was one of the earliest and most popular syncretic gods. Already in the 7th century, for example in Usa, Kyūshū, Hachiman was worshiped together with Miroku Bosatsu (Maitreya).)

The separation policy (shinbutsu bunri) was the direct cause of serious damage to important cultural assets. Because mixing the two religions was now forbidden, shrines and temples had to give away some of their treasures, thus damaging the integrity of their cultural heritage and decreasing the historical and economic value of their properties. Tsurugaoka Hachiman's giant } (the two wooden wardens usually found at the sides of a temple's entrance), being objects of Buddhist worship and therefore illegal where they were, had to be sold to Jufuku-ji, where they still are. The shrine also had to destroy Buddhism-related buildings, for example its  (a complete seven-building Buddhist temple compound), its tahōtō tower, and its .

In important ways, Tsurugaoka Hachimangū was impoverished in 1868 as a consequence of this Meiji Era policy.  The imposed, inflexible reform orthodoxy of this early Meiji period was unquestionably intended to affect Buddhism and Shinto. However, the structures and artwork of this ancient shrine-temple were not yet construed as important elements of Japan's cultural patrimony. What remains to be visited today is only a partial version of the original shrine-temple.

Meiji-Showa periods

Layout of shrine complex 

Both the shrine and the city were built with Feng Shui in mind. The present location was carefully chosen as the most propitious after consulting a diviner because it had a mountain to the north (the ), a river to the east (the Namerikawa), a great road to the west (the ) and was open to the south (on Sagami Bay). Each direction was protected by a god: Genbu guarded the north, Seiryū the east, Byakko the west and Suzaku the south. The willows near the Genpei Ponds (see below) and the catalpas next to the Museum of Modern Art represent respectively Seiryū and Byakko. In spite of all the changes the shrine has gone through over the years, in this respect Yoritomo's design is still basically intact.

There is a 1.8 km straight street in the front of shrine, called "Wakamiya Ōji (若宮大路)". It is the approach (sandō (参道)) of Tsurugaoka Hachiman-gū, there are three big Torii (Shinto gate). The Torii gate farthest from the shrine is called Ichi-no-Torii (the first torii), the one in the middle is Ni-no-Torii (the second torii) and the one in front of the shrine is San-no-Torii (the third torii).

As one enters, after San-no-Torii (the third torii) there are three small bridges, two flat ones on the sides and an arched one at the center. In the days of the shogunate there used to be only two, a normal one and another arched, made in wood and painted red. The shōgun would leave his retinue there and proceed alone on foot to the shrine. The arched bridge was called Akabashi (Red Bridge), and was reserved to him: common people had to use the flat one. The bridges span over a canal that joins two ponds popularly called , or "Genpei ponds". The term comes from the names of the two families, the Minamoto ("Gen") and the Taira ("Pei"), that fought each other in Yoritomo's day.

The stele just after and to the left of the first torii explains the origin of the name:
The Genpei Ponds 

The Azuma Kagami says that "In April 1182 Minamoto no Yoritomo told monk Senkō and Ōba Kageyoshi to have two ponds dug within the shrine." According to another version of the story, it was Yoritomo's wife Masako who, to pray for the prosperity of the Minamoto family, had these ponds dug, and had white lotuses planted in the east one and red ones in the west one, colors which are those of the Taira and Minamoto clans. From this derives their name.   
The red of those lotuses is supposed to stand for the spilled blood of the Taira.

Sub-shrines and infrastructures

Tsurugaoka Hachimangū includes several sub-shrines, the most important of which are the Junior Shrine at the bottom, and the Senior Shrine 61 steps above. The present Senior Shrine building was constructed in 1828 by Tokugawa Ienari, the 11th Tokugawa shōgun in the Hachiman-zukuri style. Right under the stairway there's an open pavilion called  where weddings, dances and music are performed.

This facility, originally created for the shōgun'''s benefit, allows one to worship at distant Yui Wakamiya (Moto Hachiman) without actually going all the way to Zaimokuza.Komachi, Nishi Mikado, by the Kamakura Citizen's Network, retrieved on July 23, 2008

Right next to the Yui Wakamiya Yōhaijo there are two stones: pouring water on them should reveal on each the contour of a turtle.
One of the islands in the Minamoto pond hosts a sub-shrine called  dedicated to goddess Benzaiten, a Buddhist deity. For this reason, the sub-shrine was dismantled in 1868 at the time of the "Shinto and Buddhism separation" order (see below) and rebuilt in 1956.

Wakamiya Ōji

An unusual feature of the shrine is its 1.8 km  (approach), which extends all the way to the ocean in Yuigahama and doubles as Wakamiya Ōji Avenue, Kamakura's main street. Built by Minamoto no Yoritomo as an imitation of Kyoto's , Wakamiya Ōji used to be much wider and flanked by both a 3 m deep canal and pine trees (see Edo period print below).

Walking from the beach toward the shrine one passes through three torii, or Shinto gates, called respectively Ichi no Torii (first gate), Ni no Torii (second gate) and San no Torii (third gate).

The dankazura becomes gradually wider so that, seen from the shrine, it will look longer than it really is. The entire length of the dankazura is under the direct administration of the shrine.

Giant ginkgo

The ginkgo tree that stood next to Tsurugaoka Hachimangū's stairway almost from its foundation and which appears in almost every old print of the shrine was completely uprooted and greatly damaged at 4:40 in the morning on March 10, 2010. According to an expert who analyzed the tree, the fall is likely due to rot. Both the tree's stump and a section of its trunk replanted nearby have produced leaves (see photo).

The tree was nicknamed  because according to an Edo period urban legend, a now-famous assassin hid behind it before striking his victim. For details, see the article Shinpen Kamakurashi.

Activities

Tsurugaoka Hachimangū is the center of much cultural activity and both yabusame, (archery from horseback), and kyūdō (Japanese archery) are practiced within the shrine. It also has extensive peony gardens, three coffee shops, a kindergarten, offices and a dōjō. Within its grounds stand two museums, the Kamakura Museum of National Treasures, owned by the City of Kamakura, and the prefectural Museum of Modern Art.

Gallery of Shrines at Tsurugaoka Hachimangū

 Notes 

See also

 Azuma Kagami
 Kamakura Museum of National Treasures
List of National Treasures of Japan (crafts-others)
List of National Treasures of Japan (crafts-swords)

References

 Bibliography 
 Azuma Kagami, accessed on September 4, 2008;  National Archives of Japan 特103-0001, digitized image of the Azumakagami 
 Brinkley, Frank and Dairoku Kikuchi. (1915).   A History of the Japanese People from the Earliest Times to the End of the Meiji Era.  New York: Encyclopædia Britannica.
 
 
 Mass, Jeffrey P. (1995).  Court and Bakufu in Japan: Essays in Kamakura History. Stanford: Stanford University Press.  
 
 
 Ponsonby-Fane, Richard Arthur Brabazon. (1962).  Sovereign and Subject. Kyoto: Ponsonby Memorial Society.
 

 External links 

 Official website (in Japanese)
 National Archives of Japan, Digital Gallery:
 Mori Koan map:  Soshu Kamakuranozu, drawn in 5th year of Horeki'' (1755).
 New York Public Library Digital Gallery:
 NYPL ID 119488, unknown photographer, albumen print, 189?-190?:  Perspective beyond torii
 NYPL ID 118907, Felice Beato, albumen print, 187?:  Shrine steps and forecourt
 NYPL ID 110031, Kusakabe Kimbei, albumen print, 188?-189?  Great stairway
 NYPL ID 118911, Felice Beato, albumen print, 187?:  Senior Shrine structural detail
 NYPL ID 118912, Felice Beato, albumen print, 187?:  Tahōtō, single-storied pagoda
 

1060s establishments in Japan
1063 establishments in Asia
Religious buildings and structures completed in 1191
Religious buildings and structures completed in 1828
Buildings and structures in Kamakura, Kanagawa
Shinto shrines in Kanagawa Prefecture
Hachiman shrines
Religious buildings and structures completed in 1063
Beppyo shrines